László Kiss may refer to:

Sports
 László Kiss (footballer) (born 1956), Hungarian coach and former footballer, played in the 1982 World Cup
 László Kiss (football manager) (born 1949), Hungarian football manager
 László Kiss (politician) (born 1979), Hungarian politician, mayor of the 3rd district of Budapest
 László Kiss (rower) (born 1951), Hungarian Olympic rower
 László Kiss (swimmer), Hungarian swimming coach

Others
 László Kiss-Rigó, Bishop since 2006 of the Roman Catholic Diocese of Szeged–Csanád
 László Kiss, member of the Hungarian underground rock band Európa Kiadó
 László Kiss, Mayor of the Hungarian village Lúč na Ostrove
 László L. Kiss (born 1972), Hungarian astronomer and discoverer of minor planets